Kamel Yesli (born 24 April 1989) is a French footballer who is last known to have played as a midfielder for MO Béjaïa.

Career

Yesli started his career with the reserves of French Ligue 1 side PSG, but left due to injury. In 2007, Yesli signed for Brétigny in the French sixth division, where he said, "I knew the reputable club because it is known for its training. The coach gave me back confidence and I regained my feelings. In eight months, I had to put in about twenty assists and ten goals." In 2008, Yesli signed for French fourth division club Sainte-Geneviève, where he suffered relegation to the French fifth division.

In 2010, Yesli signed for Paris FC in the French third division, where he trialed for Spanish La Liga team Betis and San Jose Earthquakes in the United States. In 2013, Yesli signed for Algerian outfit JS Kabylie, where he made 62 appearances and scored 3 goals. On 3 September 2013, he debuted for JS Kabylie during a 4–3 win over MC El Eulma. On 3 September 2013, Yesli scored his first goal for JS Kabylie during a 4–3 win over MC El Eulma.

References

External links
 
 

French footballers
Living people
Association football midfielders
1989 births
Expatriate footballers in Algeria
French sportspeople of Algerian descent
People from Fontenay-aux-Roses
Paris FC players
Algerian footballers
JS Kabylie players
MO Béjaïa players
Paris Saint-Germain F.C. players